David Leslie Kelly (born September 20, 1952) is a Canadian retired professional ice hockey winger who played in the National Hockey League (NHL). He played in 16 NHL games with the Detroit Red Wings during the 1976–77 season.

Career statistics

Regular season and playoffs

External links
 

1952 births
Living people
Canadian ice hockey right wingers
Detroit Red Wings players
Ice hockey people from Ontario
Kansas City Blues players
Philadelphia Firebirds (AHL) players
Providence Friars men's ice hockey players
Rhode Island Reds players
Richmond Robins players
Sportspeople from Chatham-Kent
Springfield Indians players
Undrafted National Hockey League players